Posse mit Gesang ("farce with singing", plural: Possen) is a form of popular German-language music drama, that developed in the late 18th and early 19th centuries. Early examples are sometimes called 'Possenspil' or 'Possenspiel'. It is also sometimes referred to simply as 'Posse' (farce).

Associated with Vienna, and also Berlin and Hamburg, the Posse mit Gesang was similar to the Singspiel, but generally had more action and less music than the more operatic form. Viennese examples included Ferdinand Raimund's Der Alpenkönig und der Menschenfeind of 1828 and many of the works of Johann Nestroy. Composers who contributed music for Posse included Wenzel Müller, Conradin Kreutzer, and Philip Jakob Riotte.

More specialized examples of the genre were 'Lokalposse' (daily life themes), 'Zauberposse' (magic), 'Charakterposse' (personalities), 'Situationsposse' (situations), and 'Parodierende Posse' (parodies).

Other examples of Posse mit Gesang
1820: Die Zwillingsbrüder by Franz Schubert, Vienna, Theater am Kärntnertor
1826: Herr Josef und Frau Baberl by Wenzel Müller, Vienna, Theater in der Leopoldstadt 
1842: Einen Jux will er sich machen by Johann Nestroy (text) and Adolf Müller (music)
1889: Wiener Luft by Karl Michael Ziehrer, Vienna, Theater an der Wien

References

Warrack, John and West, Ewan (1992), The Oxford Dictionary of Opera, 782 pages,  

Opera genres
Opera terminology
German music history
German literature